Water resources in India includes information on precipitation, surface and groundwater storage and hydropower potential. India accounts for 18% of the world population and about 4% of the world's water resources. One of the proposed solutions to solve the country's water woes is the Indian rivers interlinking project. However, this rain is not uniform in time or geography. Most of the rains occur during its monsoon seasons (June to September), with the north east and north receiving far more rains than India's west and south. Other than rains, the melting of snow over the Himalayas after winter season feeds the northern rivers to varying degrees. The southern rivers, however experience more flow variability over the year. For the Himalayan basin, this leads to flooding in some months and water scarcity in others. Despite extensive river system, safe clean drinking water as well as irrigation water supplies for sustainable agriculture are in shortage across India, in part because it has, as yet, harnessed a small fraction of its available and recoverable surface water resource. India harnessed  (20 percent) of its water resources in 2010, part of which came from unsustainable use of groundwater.

Vast area of India is under tropical climate which is conducive throughout the year for agriculture due to favourable warm and sunny conditions provided perennial water supply is available to cater to the high rate of evapotranspiration from the cultivated land. Though the overall water resources are adequate to meet all the requirements of the country, the water supply gaps due to temporal and spatial distribution of water resources are to be bridged by interlinking the rivers of India. The total water resources going waste to the sea are nearly 1200 billion cubic meters after sparing moderate environmental / salt export water requirements of all rivers. Food security in India is possible by achieving water security first which in turn is possible with energy security to supply the electricity for the required water pumping as part of its rivers interlinking.

Instead of opting for centralised mega water transfer projects which would take long time to give results, it would be cheaper alternative to deploy extensively shade nets over the cultivated lands for using the locally available water sources efficiently to crops throughout the year. Plants need less than 2% of total water for metabolism requirements and rest 98% is for cooling purpose through transpiration. Shade nets or polytunnels installed over the agriculture lands suitable for all weather conditions would reduce the potential evaporation drastically by reflecting the excessive and harmful sun light without falling on the cropped area.

Drought, floods and shortage of drinking water

The precipitation pattern in India varies dramatically across distance and over calendar months. Much of the precipitation in India, about 85%, is received during summer months through monsoons in the Himalayan catchments of the Ganges-Brahmaputra-Meghna basin. The north eastern region of the country receives heavy precipitation, in comparison with the north western, western and southern parts. The uncertainty in onset of annual monsoon, sometimes marked by prolonged dry spells and fluctuations in seasonal and annual rainfall is a serious problem for the country. Large area of the country is not put to use for agriculture due to local water scarcity or poor water quality. The nation sees cycles of drought years and flood years, with large parts of west and south experiencing more deficits and large variations, resulting in immense hardship particularly the poorest farmers and rural populations. Dependence on erratic rains and lack of irrigation water supply regionally leads to crop failures and farmer suicides. Despite abundant rains during June–September, some regions in other seasons see shortages of drinking water. Some years, the problem temporarily becomes too much rainfall, and weeks of havoc from floods.

Surface and ground water storage

India also relies excessively on groundwater resources, which accounts for over 50 percent of irrigated area with 20 million tube wells installed. India has built nearly 5,000 major or medium dams, barrages, etc. to store the river waters and enhance ground water recharging. About 15 percent of India's food is being produced using rapidly depleting / mining groundwater resources. The end of the era of massive expansion in groundwater use is going to demand greater reliance on surface water supply systems.

India is not running out of water whereas water is running out of India without extracting its full potential benefits. Land based water reservoirs construction is very costly after meeting the land & property compensation and rehabilitation expenditures. To create adequate water storage, fresh water coastal reservoirs located on the sea area near the river deltas, is the suitable option socioeconomically without land and forest submergence problems.

Hydro power potential

Indian rivers have fairly good hydro power potential when they descend from their source mountains (Himalayas, Western Ghats, Aravali Range, Vindhya Mountains, Eastern Ghats, etc.) before the water consumption or flowing to the sea. The hydro power potential keeps on varying depending on the technological developments including alternate power sources, priorities and limitations.

Rivers

The major rivers of India are:
 Flowing into the Bay of Bengal: Brahmaputra, Ganges, Mahanadi, Godavari, Krishna, Kaveri, etc.
 Flowing into the Arabian Sea: Indus, Narmada, Tapti, etc.

Lakes

Lakes in India include Pulicat Lake,  Kolleru Lake, Pangong Tso, Chilika Lake, Kuttanad Lake, Sambhar Salt Lake, and Pushkar Lake.

Wetlands

India is a signatory of the Ramsar Convention, an international treaty for the conservation and sustainable utilisation of wetlands

Water supply and sanitation

Water supply and sanitation in India continue to be inadequate, despite long-standing efforts by the various levels of government and communities at improving coverage. The level of investment in water and sanitation, albeit low by international standards, has increased during the 2000s. Access has also increased significantly. For example, in 1980 rural sanitation coverage was estimated at 1% and reached 21% in 2008. Also, the share of Indians with access to improved sources of water has increased significantly from 72% in 1990 to 88% in 2008. At the same time, local government institutions in charge of operating and maintaining the infrastructure are seen as weak and lack the financial resources to carry out their functions. In addition, no major city in India is known to have a continuous water supply and an estimated 72% of Indians still lack access to improved sanitation facilities.

In spite of adequate average rainfall in India, there is large area under the less water conditions/drought prone. There are lot of places, where the quality of groundwater is not good.  Another issue lies in interstate distribution of rivers. Water supply of the 90% of India's territory is served by inter-state rivers. It has created growing number of conflicts across the states and to the whole country on water sharing issues.

A number of innovative approaches to improve water supply and sanitation have been tested in India, in particular in the early 2000s. These include demand-driven approaches in rural water supply since 1999, community-led total sanitation, a public-private partnerships to improve the continuity of urban water supply in Karnataka, and the use of micro-credit to women in order to improve access to water.

Water quality issues
When sufficient salt export is not taking place from a river basin to the sea in an attempt to harness the river water fully, it leads to river basin closer and the available water in downstream area of the river basin becomes saline and/ or alkaline water. Land irrigated with saline or alkaline water becomes gradually in to saline or alkali soils. The water percolation in alkali soils is very poor leading to waterlogging problems. Proliferation of alkali soils would compel the farmers to cultivate rice or  grasses only as the soil productivity is poor with other crops and tree plantations. Cotton is the preferred crop in saline soils compared to many other crops as their yield is poor. In north eastern states high acidic nature of soils due to excessive rainfall is effecting the agriculture productivity. Interlinking water surplus rivers with water deficit rivers is needed  for the long-term sustainable productivity of the river basins and for mitigating the anthropogenic influences on the rivers by allowing adequate salt export to the sea in the form of environmental flows. Also baseflows in rivers are to be restored by stopping excessive ground water use and augmenting surface water by canals to achieve adequate salt export to the sea and preserve the water quality.

Water disputes

There is intense competition for the water available in the inter state rivers such as Kavery, Krishna, Godavari, Vamsadhara, Mandovi, Ravi-Beas-Sutlez, Narmada, Tapti, Mahanadi, etc. among the riparian states of India in the absence of water augmentation from the water surplus rivers such as Brahmaputra, Himalayan tributaries of Ganga and west flowing coastal rivers of western ghats.

Water pollution

Out of India's 3,119 towns and cities, just 209 have partial treatment facilities, and only 8 have full wastewater treatment facilities (WHO 1992). 114 cities dump untreated sewage and partially cremated bodies directly into the Ganges River. Downstream, the untreated water is used for drinking, bathing, and washing. This situation is typical of many rivers in India and river Ganga is less polluted comparatively.

Ganga

The Ganges River is the largest river in India. The extreme pollution of the Ganges affects 600 million people who live close to the river. The river water starts getting polluted when it enters the  plain. The commercial exploitation of the river has risen in proportion to the rise of population. Gangotri and Uttarkashi are good examples too.  Gangotri had only a few huts of Sadhus until the 1970s and the population of Uttrakashi has swelled in recent years.

Yamuna

Yamuna is one of the few sacred rivers in India which is worshipped by many Indians as a goddess. However, due to the exponentially rising amounts of tourists and pilgrims with addition to the rising population of the inhabitants of its banks, Yamuna has come under extreme duress. Due to this unprecedented rise, the river has become polluted. The river has become extremely polluted such that the Indian government has launched the Yamuna Action Plan to help the cause.

Water security
In India, there is competition for water resources of all inter state rivers except the main Brahmaputra river among the riparian states of India and also with neighboring countries which are Nepal, China, Pakistan, Bhutan, Bangladesh, etc. Vast area of the Indian subcontinent is under tropical climate which is conducive for agriculture due to favorable warm and sunny conditions provided perennial water supply is available to cater to the high rate of evapotranspiration from the cultivated land. Though the overall water resources are adequate to meet all the requirements of the subcontinent, the water supply gaps due to temporal and spatial distribution of water resources among the states and countries in the subcontinent are to be bridged.

There is intense competition for the water available in the inter state rivers such as Kavery, Krishna, Godavari, Vamsadhara, Mandovi, Ravi-Beas-Sutlez, Narmada, Tapti, Mahanadi, etc. among the riparian states of India in the absence of water augmentation from the water surplus rivers such as Brahmaputra, Himalayan tributaries of Ganga and west flowing coastal rivers of western ghats. All river basins face severe water shortage even for drinking needs of people, cattle and wild life during the intense summer season when the rainfall is negligible.

Water security can be achieved along with energy security as it is going to consume electricity to link the surplus water areas with the water deficit areas by lift canals, pipe lines, etc.

See also

 Environment of India
 Kalpasar Project
 List of rivers by dissolved load
 Ground water in India
 Interstate River Water Disputes Act
 Irrigation in India
 List of drainage basins by area
 List of rivers of India by discharge
 List of rivers by discharge
 List of dams and reservoirs in India
 National Water Policy

References

External links

 Children's Eyes on Earth 2012 photography contest – in pictures Peaceful Co-existence Guardian 9 October 2012